The 2018 Women's Asian Champions Trophy was the fifth edition of the Women's Asian Champions Trophy, a field hockey tournament for the five best Asian women's national field hockey teams organized by the Asian Hockey Federation.

The tournament was held in Donghae, South Korea. The top five Asian teams (China, India, Japan, South Korea and Malaysia) participated in the tournament which involved a round-robin tournament among all teams followed by play-offs for the final positions.

Qualified teams
The following teams have qualified:

Results

Round-robin

Classification round

Third place game

Final

Final standings

See also
2018 Men's Asian Champions Trophy
Field hockey at the 2018 Asian Games – Women's tournament

References

Asian Champions Trophy
Asian Champions Trophy
Women's Asian Champions Trophy
International women's field hockey competitions hosted by South Korea
Donghae City
Asian Champions Trophy
Sport in Gangwon Province, South Korea